William of Jülich may refer to:

 William of Jülich (died 1304)
 William V, Duke of Jülich (died 1361)
 William II, Duke of Jülich (died 1393)
 William I of Gelders and Jülich (1364-1402)
 William, Duke of Jülich-Cleves-Berg "the Rich" (1516-1592)